Lilia Airatovna Biktagirova (born 1 December 1990) is a Russian former competitive figure skater. She is the 2005–06 Russian national bronze medalist and placed 13th at the 2005 World Junior Championships. She was coached by Svetlana Sokolovskaya at CSKA Moscow.

After retiring from competition, Biktagirova turned to coaching, working alongside Sokolovskaya in Moscow. The two coached Mark Kondratiuk to gold at the 2022 European Championships.

Programs

Competitive highlights

References

External links

 

Russian female single skaters
1990 births
Figure skaters from Moscow
Living people
Russian figure skating coaches